Aglajidae is a family of often colorful, medium-sized, sea slugs, marine opisthobranch gastropod mollusks. These are not nudibranchs; instead they are headshield slugs, in the clade Cephalaspidea.

Note on the authority and dates
Family names such as this one, Aglajidae Pilsbry, 1895 (1847), that have two dates (the second one in parentheses) are those names which are ruled by Article 40(2) of the ICZN Code. "If ... a family-group name was replaced before 1961 because of the synonymy of the type genus, the replacement name is to be maintained if it is in prevailing usage. A name maintained by virtue of this Article retains its own author [and date, the first date cited] but takes the priority of the replaced name [the date cited in parentheses, here alluding to Doridiinae Gray, 1847]

Genera
Genera and species within the family Aglajidae include:

 Aglaja Renier, 1807 – 7 species (type genus)
 Aglaona Chaban, Ekimova, Schepetov & Chernyshev, 2022
 Biuve Zamora-Silva & Malaquias, 2017 – 1 species
 Camachoaglaja Zamora-Silva & Malaquias, 2017 – 7 species
 Chelidonura A. Adams, 1850 – 17 species
 Mannesia Zamora-Silva & Malaquias, 2017 – 1 species
 Mariaglaja Zamora-Silva & Malaquias, 2017 – 4 species
 Melanochlamys Cheeseman, 1881 – 15 species
 Nakamigawaia Kuroda & Habe, 1961 – 2 species
 Navanax Pilsbry, 1895 – 5 species
 Niparaya Zamora-Silva & Malaquias, 2017 – 1 species
 Odontoglaja Rudman, 1978 – 2 species
 Philinopsis Pease, 1860 – 15 species
 Spinoaglaja Ortea, Moro & Espinosa, 2007 – 3 species
 Spinophallus Zamora-Silva & Malaquias, 2017 – 2 species
 Tubulophilinopsis Zamora-Silva & Malaquias, 2017 – 4 species

Gallery

References

 
Gastropod families
Taxa named by Henry Augustus Pilsbry